The 1992–93 Meistriliiga was the second season of the Meistriliiga, Estonia's premier football league. Norma won their second title.

League table

Results

Top scorers

See also
 1992 in Estonian football
 1993 in Estonian football
 1992–93 Esiliiga

References

 Estonia - List of final tables (RSSSF)

Meistriliiga seasons
1992 in Estonian football
1993 in Estonian football
Estonia